75B is a design studio based in Rotterdam, Netherlands.

They designed the identity for the International Film Festival Rotterdam, Ro Theatre, Van Abbemuseum, and Codarts. 
They also made autonomous works that were exhibited at the Fons Welters Gallery in Amsterdam and are part of the collection of Stedelijk Museum Amsterdam, SF MOMA and the Graphic Design Museum Breda.

Works 
 2000 The design of the skatepark on the southern edge of Rotterdam's central business district.
 2001 Exhibition Kijk hier es naar Fons Welters Gallery Amsterdam
 2006 Designs for the Exhibition It's All Dalí on Salvador Dalí for Museum Boijmans van Beuningen
 2007 Design campaign Rotterdam 2007 City of Architecture awarded by IMCA
 2009 Identity for International Film Festival Rotterdam

History 
75B was founded by Robert Beckand, Rens Muis and Pieter Vos in 1997. They met during their study at the Willem de Kooning Academy in Rotterdam, Netherlands. In 2006 they were artist in residence at Art Center College of Design in Pasadena. In 2009 Beckand left the studio and Muis and Vos continued working together.

Publications 

 Trees J, Nugent L, Hafermaas N, Johnston S, 75B LAX, Veenman Publishers, Rotterdam 2008
 Coyner B, 75B 10x10, Veenman Publishers, Rotterdam 2006
 Rhode C, Platteel A, Symbol Soup -Look-, Thames & Hudson, London 1999,
 Holland International, Dutch Design Dead, 1998

References

External links

75B Residency Art Center College of Design
75B 10x10 Exhibition
75B Stamp Design
75B Heroes' Night

Graphic design studios